Wożuczyn-Cukrownia  is a settlement in the administrative district of Gmina Rachanie, within Tomaszów Lubelski County, Lublin Voivodeship, in eastern Poland.

The settlement has a population of 789.

References

Villages in Tomaszów Lubelski County